The 2023 Ohio Valley Conference Men's Basketball Tournament was the final event of the 2022–23 NCAA Division I men's basketball season in the Ohio Valley Conference. The tournament was held March 1–4, 2023 at the Ford Center in Evansville, Indiana.

Seeds 
Only the top eight teams in the conference qualified for the tournament. Teams were seeded by record within the conference, with a tiebreaker system to seed teams with identical conference records. 

If a team that is not eligible for the NCAA Tournament wins the Ohio Valley Conference Tournament, the conference's automatic bid goes to the tournament runner-up. If that team is also not eligible, i.e. two ineligible teams met in the tournament final, the automatic bid goes to the highest seeded tournament-eligible team.

Schedule

Bracket 

* — Denotes overtime period

References 

Tournament
Ohio Valley Conference men's basketball tournament
College basketball tournaments in Indiana
Basketball competitions in Evansville, Indiana
Ohio Valley Conference men's basketball tournament
Ohio Valley Conference men's basketball tournament